Arlene Bishop is a Canadian lyricist, screenwriter, artist and singer-songwriter.

Biography 
Arlene Bishop was born in Churchill, Manitoba and raised in Ottawa, Ontario.  She currently resides in Toronto. As a recording artists Bishop has placed several songs in film and television. Most notably her song "98 Points" has appeared in New Waterford Girl, The Michael Jackson Story and The Man in the Mirror for VH1. As a first time music producer Bishop (along with Scott Dibble), released "Begin Again" with two parts: Part One as a voice production with acoustic guitar  and Part Two with an array of special guests that included Amin Bhatia, Blair Packham, Simon Law (Soul II Soul) and Will Ackerman.  The resulting album is titled "Twenty Four is Twelve Twice or Twenty Four for Short".  In 2017 Bishop assembled a vocal orchestra she called The Spirit of Adventure and recorded a live concert album called "Together Tonight" and in 2019 she discovered and released a bootleg recording from 1992 at The Cabana Room in Toronto.

As a screenwriter Bishop (along with Blair Packham, David Mackenzie and Brigitte Gall) penned the Fringe Festival one-woman play Joan of Montreal, which became Brigitte Gall's Joan of Montreal for The Comedy Network.  She has also written several unproduced screenplays. As an experimental artist she created the "I, Butterfly" digital collage for Begin Again and as a videomaker created an animated video series for the same CD.

As a theme lyricist Arlene Bishop has written for Pandalian, Pecola, Beyblade, Beyblade: Metal Fusion and Jane and the Dragon.  As a guest singer she has appeared on recordings by Marc Nadjiwan, Scott Dibble and Barenaked Ladies. Her songs and co-writes have appeared on recordings by Blair Packham, John Alcorn, Suzie Vinnick, Jackie Richardson and Marie Rottrova.

Discography 
Pinky (1996)
 Spin Another One
 Cherry Moon
 Small Girlish Hand
 I Can't Stand It
 Black Cat
 Rabbit

Snarky Girlpop (2001)
 NV
 98 Points
 Hurricane
 Bow Before Your Love
 Six Little Angels
 Eleven Seconds
 Eddie Standing Ready
 My Way of Saying Goodbye
 Sympathy
 Irresponsible Thing
 Human Being

Cut a Man's Heart Out (2004) 
 Metaphor For Your Life
 Cut A Man's Heart Out (Angel Mix)
 Invisible Woman
 Ruin Me
 One Shoe
 Arctic Wolf
 (You Can't) Bend the River
 Insomniac
 Half Plus Half More
 Au Revoir
 Superstar
 In Context
 Cut A Man's Heart Out (Devil Mix)

Twenty Four is Twelve Twice or Twenty Four for Short (2012)
 Save Me
 My Time Will Come
 Beehive
 Let Them Swing
 Now
 Once it Changes
 Get Back Home
 Window
 Your Name Carved
 If There's a God (You'll be with Me)
 Ring of Truth
 Begin Again

Together Tonight: Live in Concert with the Spirit of Adventure (2017)
 Nothing
 Confession
 Long Slow Kiss
 Terminate
 Someone I Used to Love
 Psychic
 Sparrow
 Reincarnation
 I Would Do It Again
 Hummery
 The Moon Something
 Lovers and Satan's Basement
 I'm One
 Thank You

The Cabana Room Bootleg (Thank You Jimmy Scopes) (2019)
 Black Cat
 When it was just me and Jimmy
 Half Plus Half More
 Bad News Boys
 Arctic Wolf
 Well, any birthdays today?
 Human Being
 Of course it's not a pleasure
 (You Can't) Bend the River
 Big Ending

References

External links 
Arlene Bishop

Year of birth missing (living people)
Living people
People from Churchill, Manitoba
Musicians from Manitoba
Canadian singer-songwriters
Canadian women singer-songwriters